Lidel was an Italian nationalist women's fashion magazine which was in circulation in the period 1919–1935. The title was a reference to its founder's name, Lydia Dosio De Liguoro, as well as to the words Letture, illustrazioni, disegni, eleganze, lavori (Readings, illustrations, drawings, elegance, works in English). The magazine played a significant role in the birth of Italian fashion, but at the same time became one of the most militant publications of Fascist Italy.

History and profile
Lidel was launched by journalist Lydia Dosio De Liguoro in 1919. It was published on a monthly basis and had its headquarters in Milan. The magazine's target reader group was bourgeois women, and its goal was to instill a sense of Italian national identity and nationhood among these women. It employed fashion to promote the idea of a modern Italy and a sense of pride and solidarity among Italians.

Major contributors of Lidel were Grazia Deledda, Luigi Pirandello, Ada Negri, Carola Prosperi, Sibilla Aleramo, Amalia Guglielminetti, Goffredo Bellonci, Matilde Serao and Eugenio Treves. The cover page of the monthly featured work by Bruno Munari last of which was published in the November 1930 issue. The magazine folded in 1935.

References

External links

1919 establishments in Italy
1935 disestablishments in Italy
Defunct magazines published in Italy
Fascist newspapers and magazines
Italian-language magazines
Magazines established in 1919
Magazines disestablished in 1935
Monthly magazines published in Italy
Women's magazines published in Italy
Women's fashion magazines
Magazines published in Milan